Beginner may refer to:
Beginners (short story collection), title given to the manuscript version of Raymond Carver's 1981 short story collection What We Talk About When We Talk About Love
Beginners, a 2010 drama film written and directed by Mike Mills
Beginner (band), a German rap group
"Beginner" (song), a 2010 song by Japanese idol girl group AKB48

See also
Help:Introduction, if you want to learn to edit Wikipedia.